Tarancón is a municipality of Spain located in the province of Cuenca, Castilla–La Mancha. As of 2018, it has a population of 14,834, which makes it the second most populated municipality in the province.

History 
The place's repopulation presumably dates back to the late 12th to early 13th century. Throughout the rest of the middle ages, Tarancón was a hamlet belonging to the land of Uclés, a dominion of the Order of Santiago after 1174. Uclés was granted township status in 1537. It was granted the title of 'city' (ciudad) in 1921.

References
Citations

Bibliography
 

Municipalities in the Province of Cuenca